The Tokyo Showdown is the first live album by Swedish heavy metal band In Flames. It was recorded during their Japanese tour in 2000 at their show in Tokyo. During their performance of "Scorn" they incorporated the opening riffs of Slayer's "Raining Blood".

The album title was inspired by the action film Showdown in Little Tokyo.

Track listing

Bonus disc 
On the LP version and on the two-CD version released by Scarecrow Records (under license by Nuclear Blast) there is a bonus disc with additional tracks.

Personnel
Anders Fridén  –  vocals
Jesper Strömblad  –  guitars
Björn Gelotte –  guitars
Peter Iwers  –  bass
Daniel Svensson  –  drums
Mixed and produced by Anders Fridén and In Flames at Studio Fredman during the spring of 2001
Mastered by Göran Finnberg at The Mastering Room
Artwork and design by Niklas Sundin and Cabin Fever Media
 Masayuki Noda – photography

References

In Flames albums
2001 live albums
Nuclear Blast live albums